In France, open access to scholarly communication is relatively robust and has strong public support. Revues.org, a digital platform for social science and humanities publications, launched in 1999. Hyper Articles en Ligne (HAL) began in 2001. The French National Center for Scientific Research participated in 2003 in the creation of the influential Berlin Declaration on Open Access to Knowledge in the Sciences and Humanities. Publishers EDP Sciences and  belong to the international Open Access Scholarly Publishers Association.

Open Repositories
There are a number of collections of scholarship in France housed in digital open access repositories. They contain journal articles, book chapters, data, and other research outputs that are free to read.
The main open repository platform in use for French higher education and research institutions is HAL. It hosts over 520 000 fulltext documents and about 1.5 million references. More than 120 institutions have opened their own institutional portals on the HAL platform.

Open access publishing

France's main actor in open access publishing is Openedition. This set of publishing platforms is specialized in Human and Social Sciences. It hosts 490 journals, 5,600+ books, 2,600+ blogs and 39,000 events. Openedition is operated by an institutional unit called CLEO, and funded by the Centre national de la recherche scientifique, Ecole des hautes etudes en sciences sociales, Université d'Aix-Marseille, and Université d'Avignon et des Pays de Vaucluse. It uses for books and journals a "freemium" business model: most content is available in HTML format for free, and the other formats (pdf, epub) are available to the subscribed institutions.

Timeline

Key events in the development of open access in France include the following:
 1999
 Creation of the Revues.org portal by Marin Dacos, with 2 open access journals
 2001
 23 March: French Wikipedia, a French-language open educational resource, begins publication
 HAL repository platform launched, operated by the CCSD
 2005
 HAL-Inria repository launched
 2013
 Signature of a partnership agreement in favour of open archives and HAL by French higher education and research institutions
2016
 Law for a digital Republic, creating a right for the researchers to submit their accepted manuscripts to institutional repositories, eventually with an embargo period, even if they've signed a copyright transfer agreement.
 2018
  cancels its subscription to a bundle of several journals published by Springer Nature.
 4 July: French Minister for Higher Education, Research and Innovation Frédérique Vidal announces a National Plan for Open Science
 4 September: Researchers from France take part in the Europe-wide Plan S initiative.

See also

 Open data in France
 Internet in France
 Education in France
 Media of France
 Copyright law of France
 Science and technology in France
 Open access in other countries

References

Further reading

External links
 
  (Website launched in 2008).
 
 
 
 
 

Academia in France
France
Publishing in France
Science and technology in France
Communications in France